Kaansoo  is a village in Põhja-Pärnumaa Parish, Pärnu County in western-central Estonia. In 2011, the population of Kaansoo was 108.

References

 

Villages in Pärnu County